Rosa is a municipality in the district Schmalkalden-Meiningen, in Thuringia, Germany.
It is situated in the Rosatal valley at the foot of Stopfelskuppe, a preserved natural site with an extinct volcan of 620m.

References

Municipalities in Thuringia
Schmalkalden-Meiningen
Duchy of Saxe-Meiningen